Mary Williams may refer to:

Mary Ann Williams (1821–1874), American proponent for Memorial Day
Mary Bushnell Williams (1826–1891), American author, poet, translator
Mary Mildred Williams (1847–1911), born into slavery in Virginia
Mary Rogers Williams (1857–1907), American artist
Mary Gilmore Williams (1863–1938), American professor of Greek
Mary Floyd Williams (1866–1959), American librarian and California historian
Mary Williams (caricaturist) (1869–1960), American caricaturist who used the pseudonym Kate Carew
Mary Wilhelmine Williams (1878–1944), historian
Mary Williams (professor) (1883–1977),  Welsh academic of modern languages
Mary Lou Williams (1910–1981), American jazz pianist, composer, and arranger
Mary A. Williams, a 19th-century Sandy Hook pilot boat
Mary Burrus Williams (born 1941), co-author of historical novels under the pen name Bronwyn Williams
Mary Alice Williams (born 1949), former television anchor
Mary Williams (Wisconsin politician) (born 1949), member of the Wisconsin State Assembly
Mary Ellen Coster Williams (born 1953), United States Court of Federal Claims judge
Mary Vesta Williams (1957–2011), American singer-songwriter
Mary Williams (activist) (born 1967), American social activist and adopted daughter of Jane Fonda
Mary Elizabeth Williams, American writer and commentator
Mary Williams (The Young and the Restless), fictional television character
Mary Williams, former Chief Secretary of the Isle of Man
Mary Frances Williams, American politician
Mary Williams, character in Another Man, Another Chance